Philz Coffee is an American coffee company and coffeehouse chain based in San Francisco, California, and is considered a major player in third wave coffee. Philz Coffee focuses on making pour over coffee. Philz Coffee has 69 locations spread throughout the San Francisco Bay Area, greater Los Angeles, San Diego, Sacramento, Washington, D.C., Virginia, and most recently in Chicago. Philz was founded by Phil Jaber and his son Jacob, both of whom are located in San Francisco area.

In addition to its extensive line of coffee and drinks, Philz also sells a line of merchandise and bagged coffee blends for purchase online.

History
Phil Jaber, born in Palestine, and his son Jacob founded Philz Coffee in 2003. Phil operated a corner grocery in San Francisco's Mission District for over 25 years and had strong ties to the community. In 2005, Phil's son, Jacob Jaber, took over operation and became the company's CEO, taking the lead on expansion and building the company's internal structure. 

Philz Coffee secured a round of funding in 2013 by Summit Partners and a few private investors to expand into new markets, leading to the first Philz Coffee outside the Bay Area in Santa Monica California. In February 2015 they secured a $15M Series B round in order to help them expand worldwide. In September 2016, they closed a $45M Series C round from San Francisco-based private equity firm TPG Growth to continue the expansion.

See also

 List of coffeehouse chains

References

External links
 

Coffee companies of the United States
Coffeehouses and cafés in the United States
2002 establishments in California
Mission District, San Francisco